Time Waits for No One may refer to:

 "Time Waits for No One", a 1970 Neil Sedaka song, popularized by The Friends of Distinction
 "Time Waits for No One", a 1974 Rolling Stones song
 Time Waits for No One: Anthology 1971–1977, a 1979 Rolling Stones compilation album named after the song
 "Time Waits for No One", a 1980 The Jacksons song from Triumph
 Time Waits for No One, a 1989 album by American singer Mavis Staples
 Time Waits for No One, a 2019 re-released remix for the 1986 Freddie Mercury song "Time"
 "Time Waits for No One", a song from the 1944 musical film Shine On, Harvest Moon